Gustavo Ezequiel Machado Ferrando (born 23 June 2001) is a Uruguayan professional footballer who plays as a midfielder for Cerro Largo.

Career
A youth academy graduate of Rampla Juniors, Machado made his professional debut on 14 July 2019 in a 0–1 loss against Fénix. He joined Cerro Largo in March 2021.

Born in Argentina, Machado represents Uruguay at international level. He is currently part of Uruguay under-20 team.

Career statistics

Club

References

External links
 

2001 births
Living people
Sportspeople from Lanús
Association football midfielders
Uruguayan footballers
Uruguayan Primera División players
Uruguayan Segunda División players
Rampla Juniors players
Cerro Largo F.C. players